Zachary "Zach" Jackson (born March 5, 1996) is an American soccer player who plays for Rio Grande Valley FC in the USL Championship.

Career

Youth and college 
Jackson played four years of college soccer, beginning at the University of Tulsa in 2014, before transferring to Furman University in 2016.

While at college, Jackson appeared for USL Premier Development League side Brazos Valley Cavalry in 2017.

Professional 
On January 28, 2019, Jackson signed for USL Championship side Rio Grande Valley FC Toros. He made his professional debut on April 24, 2019, in a 4–4 draw with LA Galaxy II.

References

External links 

  Tulsa bio
  Furman bio
  RGVFC Toros bio
  USL Championship bio

1996 births
Living people
American soccer players
Association football defenders
Furman Paladins men's soccer players
Brazos Valley Cavalry FC players
Rio Grande Valley FC Toros players
Soccer players from Texas
Tulsa Golden Hurricane men's soccer players
USL League Two players
USL Championship players